The Hollow World Campaign Set is an accessory for the Dungeons & Dragons fantasy role-playing game.

Contents
Hollow World is a campaign setting boxed set detailing the enormous hollow inside of the planet of Mystara, and the people and creatures that inhabit the lands found there.

Publication history
Hollow World was written by Aaron Allston, with a cover by Fred Fields and interior illustrations by Thomas Baxa and Mark Nelson, and was published by TSR in 1990 as a boxed set containing a 128-page book, a 64-page book, and a 32-page book, and four large color maps.

Reception

Reviews

References

Dungeons & Dragons sourcebooks
Mystara
Role-playing game supplements introduced in 1990